The Aviation Heritage Museum is a museum created and maintained by the RAAF Association of Western Australia.  It houses many military and civilian aircraft, aircraft replicas and aircraft engines, of types that have served in the Royal Australian Air Force or have relevance to aviation in Western Australia.  It is located in the suburb of Bull Creek in Perth, Western Australia.

History 
The Western Australian Division of the RAAF Association acquired a Mark 22 Supermarine Spitfire from England in 1959 and erected it on a pole outside the Association's Headquarters in Perth.  On 1 December 1962 the Association acquired an Avro Lancaster from the French.  Many other exhibits of interest to Association members and the public were obtained in the following years.  With financial assistance from the Western Australian Government a museum building was erected at the Association's Memorial Estate in the Perth suburb of Bull Creek.  The museum building was officially opened in November 1979.  In order to house the Avro Lancaster and Douglas Dakota the Association raised funds and erected a second museum building that was opened in December 1983. Since then many smaller buildings have been added, including a 48,000 book library, photo lab, workshop, model repair shop and technical library.

Gallery

Displays 
The following exhibits are on static display in the museum:

Aircraft 
AerMacchi MB-326H
Auster J-5 Adventurer
Avro Anson
Avro Lancaster B VII NX622
Bell UH-1H Iroquois
Bensen gyrocopter
CAC Wackett
CAC Wirraway
Consolidated PBY Catalina
De Havilland DH-82 Tiger Moth
De Havilland DH-94 Moth Minor
De Havilland Vampire
Douglas Dakota
English Electric Canberra, license built by Government Aircraft Factories
Gardan GY-80 Horizon (Sugar Bird Lady)
General Dynamics F-111C crew module ("ejectable cockpit")
Link Trainer - early flight simulator
Mignet Pou-du-Ciel (Flying Flea)
Panavia Tornado GR4
Parasol
Percival Proctor Mk. III
RotorWay Scorpion helicopter
Supermarine Spitfire Mk. 22
 Tandem unmanned aerial vehicle for mining applications

Aircraft replicas 
Bristol Tourer
Hawker Hurricane - 5/8 scale
Santos-Dumont Demoiselle
Sopwith Camel
Bede BD-5
Sandhawk missile & launcher
Supermarine Spitfire (outside, at the entrance)

Engines 
Armstrong Siddeley Genet Major
Armstrong Siddeley Genet Minor
Armstrong Siddeley Cheetah
Blackburne Tomtit
Blackburn Cirrus
Pratt & Whitney Wasp
Rolls-Royce Avon
Rolls-Royce Dart
Rolls-Royce Derwent
Rolls-Royce Griffon
Rolls-Royce Merlin
Sunbeam DYAK 1 (First Qantas engine)
Wright Whirlwind
Wright Cyclone
Wright R-3350
Armstrong Siddeley Mamba
Rolls-Royce Nene
Rolls-Royce Viper
Turbomeca Turmo
 
The museum specimen of the R-3350 is the no. 1 engine from a C-121G Super Constellation from NASA, registration N421NA. This Constellation flew between Geraldton and the Carnarvon satellite tracking station in support of the Apollo space program.

Artefacts 
Remains from the NASA Skylab. These were found in Western Australia, after Skylab's re-entry into the Earth's atmosphere in 1979.

See also

RAAF Museum
RAAF Wagga Heritage Centre
List of aerospace museums

References

External links 

 
 Aviation Heritage Museum of Western Australia
 Photographs
 Video of the Museum

Aerospace museums in Australia
Air force museums
1979 establishments in Australia
Museums in Perth, Western Australia
Military and war museums in Australia
History of the Royal Australian Air Force
Aviation in Western Australia
Bull Creek, Western Australia